In Greek mythology, Poena or Poine is the spirit of punishment and the attendant of punishment to Nemesis, the goddess of divine retribution. Sometimes mentioned as one being, and sometimes in the plural as Poenai (Ποιναί) and are akin to the Erinyes. Her Roman equivalent may have been Ultio. 

The Greek word poinḗ, is meaning as penalty. And from this word the Latin poena meaning "pain, punishment, penalty" derived, which in turn gave rise to English words such as "subpoena" and "pain".

References

External links
LacusCurtius – Poena
Georg Autenrieth, A Homeric Dictionary

Greek goddesses
Roman goddesses
Vengeance goddesses
Justice goddesses
Personifications in Greek mythology
Personifications in Roman mythology